Alas, officially Alas Administrative Post, is an administrative post (and was formerly a subdistrict) in the centre of Manufahi municipality, which lies in the centre of East Timor.

The South Laclo, the largest river in Manufahi, flows across the Alas plain and into the Timor Sea.  In the centre of Alas, to the East of Alas town, the river is joined by a tributary and forms a large lake with many islands.  The Clerec river forms a border to the East, where the administrative post of Alas meets the administrative post of Fatuberlio.  Fatuberlio then continues on, past Alas, to  the North.  Shortly before the river mouth, the Clerec forms a lagoon known as the Lagoa Mapliu.  A number of further lagoons are to be found on both sides of the Lacló and Clerec estuaries.   
The most southerly point of Alas, Ponta Metibot is located some distance East of the Quelan estuary, to the West of Same administrative post.

Demographics
The population of Alas Administrative Post as of the 2010 census was 7,179, rising from 6,485 in 2004.  The average age among inhabitants was 17.4 years 

The most commonly spoken language is Tetum Terik, a dialect of Tetum.

49% of households in Alas grow cassava, 51% grow corn, 48% grow assorted vegetables, 43% grow rice and 27% grow coffee.  53% of households own coconut palm trees.

References

External links 

  – information page on Ministry of State Administration site 

Administrative posts of East Timor
Manufahi Municipality